Swarm robotics is an approach to the coordination of multiple robots as a system which consist of large numbers of mostly simple physical robots. ″In a robot swarm, the collective behavior of the robots results from local interactions between the robots and between the robots and the environment in which they act.″ It is supposed that a desired collective behavior emerges from the interactions between the robots and interactions of robots with the environment. This approach emerged on the field of artificial swarm intelligence, as well as the biological studies of insects, ants and other fields in nature, where swarm behaviour occurs.

Definition
The research of swarm robotics is to study the design of robots, their physical body and their controlling behaviours. It is inspired but not limited by the emergent behaviour observed in social insects, called swarm intelligence. Relatively simple individual rules can produce a large set of complex swarm behaviours. A key component is the communication between the members of the group that build a system of constant feedback. The swarm behaviour involves constant change of individuals in cooperation with others, as well as the behaviour of the whole group.

Unlike distributed robotic systems in general, swarm robotics emphasizes a large number of robots, and promotes scalability, for instance by using only local communication. That local communication for example can be achieved by wireless transmission systems, like radio frequency or infrared.

Goals and applications 
Miniaturization and cost are key factors in swarm robotics.  These are the constraints in building large groups of robots; therefore the simplicity of the individual team member should be emphasized.  This should motivate a swarm-intelligent approach to achieve meaningful behavior at swarm-level, instead of the individual level. Much research has been directed at this goal of simplicity at the individual robot level. Being able to use actual hardware in research of Swarm Robotics rather than simulations allows researchers to encounter and resolve many more issues and broaden the scope of Swarm Research.  Thus, development of simple robots for Swarm intelligence research is a very important aspect of the field.  The goals include keeping the cost of individual robots low to allow scalability, making each member of the swarm less demanding of resources and more power/energy efficient.

Compared with individual robots, a swarm can commonly decompose its given missions to their subtasks; a swarm is more robust to partial swarm failure and is more flexible with regard to different missions.

One such swarm system is the LIBOT Robotic System that involves a low cost robot built for outdoor swarm robotics. The robots are also made with provisions for indoor use via Wi-Fi, since the GPS sensors provide poor communication inside buildings.  Another such attempt is the micro robot (Colias), built in the Computer Intelligence Lab at the University of Lincoln, UK. This micro robot is built on a 4 cm circular chassis and is low-cost and open platform for use in a variety of Swarm Robotics applications.

Applications 

Potential applications for swarm robotics are many.  They include tasks that demand miniaturization (nanorobotics, microbotics), like distributed sensing tasks in micromachinery or the human body. One of the most promising uses of swarm robotics is in search and rescue missions.  Swarms of robots of different sizes could be sent to places that rescue-workers can't reach safely, to explore the unknown environment and solve complex mazes via onboard sensors. On the other hand, swarm robotics can be suited to tasks that demand cheap designs, for instance mining or agricultural shepherding tasks.

More controversially, swarms of military robots can form an autonomous army.   U.S. Naval forces have tested a swarm of autonomous boats that can steer and take offensive actions by themselves. The boats are unmanned and can be fitted with any kind of kit to deter and destroy enemy vessels.

During the Syrian Civil War, Russian forces in the region reported attacks on their main air force base in the country by swarms of fixed-wing drones loaded with explosives.

Most efforts have focused on relatively small groups of machines. However, a swarm consisting of 1,024 individual robots was demonstrated by Harvard in 2014, the largest to date.

Another large set of applications may be solved using swarms of micro air vehicles, which are also broadly investigated nowadays.  In comparison with the pioneering studies of swarms of flying robots using precise motion capture systems in laboratory conditions, current systems such as Shooting Star can control teams of hundreds of micro aerial vehicles in outdoor environment using GNSS systems (such as GPS) or even  stabilize them using onboard localization systems where GPS is unavailable.  Swarms of micro aerial vehicles have been already tested in tasks of autonomous surveillance, plume tracking, and reconnaissance in a compact phalanx.  Numerous works on cooperative swarms of unmanned ground and aerial vehicles have been conducted with target applications of cooperative environment monitoring, simultaneous localization and mapping, convoy protection, and moving target localization and tracking.

Additionally, progress has been made in the application of autonomous swarms in the field of manufacturing, known as swarm 3D printing. This is particularly useful for the production of large structures and components, where traditional 3D printing is not able to be utilized due to hardware size constraints. Miniaturization and mass mobilization allows the manufacturing system to achieve scale invariance, not limited in effective build volume. While in its early stage of development, swarm 3D printing is currently being commercialized by startup companies. Using the Rapid Induction Printing metal additive manufacturing process, Rosotics was the first company to demonstrate swarm 3D printing using a metallic payload, and the only to achieve metallic 3D printing from an airborne platform.

Drone swarming
Drone swarms are used in target search, drone displays, and delivery. A drone display commonly uses multiple, lighted drones at night for an artistic display or advertising. A drone swarm in delivery can carry multiple packages to a single destination at a time and overcome single drone's payload and battery limitations. A drone swarm may undertake different flight formations to reduce overall energy consumption due to drag forces.

See also

References

External links
 Fully decentralized robotic swarm performing collective search and exploration – Applied Complexity Group and Motion, Energy Control Lab at SUTD 
 Swarm-bots: Swarms of self-assembling artifacts – EU IST-FET project (2001–2005)
 Award-winning swarm-bot video at AAAI 2007

Multi-robot systems
Emerging technologies